Ets variant 2 is a protein that in humans is encoded by the ETV2 gene. It is a transcription factor and also plays a role in vascular endothelial cell development.

References 

Transcription factors